Stenolechia deltocausta is a moth of the family Gelechiidae. It is found in Assam, India.

The wingspan is about 10 mm. The forewings are pale ochreous tinged or minutely striolated with grey. The markings are black, margined with white. There is a streak along the basal one-fifth of the costa and a dot above the fold at one-fourth, one obliquely beyond it towards the dorsum and a large triangular blotch extending on the costa from one-third to three-fifths, and reaching three-fourths of the way across the wing. There is also a dot just above the tornus, and one in the disc above this. Some irregular blackish-grey suffusion is found towards the costa posteriorly and there is an acutely angulated white transverse line at three-fourths, two or three black scales preceding the angle, as well as a minute black apical dot. The hindwings are light grey.

References

Moths described in 1929
Stenolechia